Olive leaf is the leaf of the olive tree (Olea europaea). Although olive oil is well known for its flavor and possible health benefits, the leaf and its extracts remain under preliminary research with unknown effects on human health.

Leaf characteristics 
When consumed, leaves have an astringent bitter taste.

Chemical compounds 
Olive phenolics are much more concentrated in the leaves compared with olive fruit or olive oil: 1450 mg total phenolics/100 g fresh leaf vs. 110 mg/100 g fruit and 23 mg/100 ml extra virgin olive oil. Chemical compounds in unprocessed olive leaf are oleuropein and hydroxytyrosol, as well as polyphenols and flavonoids, including  luteolin, rutin, caffeic acid, catechin and apigenin. Elenolic acid is a component of olive oil and olive leaf extract. It can be considered as a marker for maturation of olives. Oleuropein, together with other closely related compounds such as 10-hydroxyoleuropein, ligstroside and 10-hydroxyligstroside, are tyrosol esters of elenolic acid. The phenolic composition of olive leaf extract varies according to plant variety, harvesting season and method, leaf maturity, storage conditions and extraction method.

Culinary uses 
Olive leaves are sometimes used in deluxe Chinese cuisine. Olive leaves have been used by Gina Keatley in the creation of Matche, powdered olive leaves used on desserts and in tea.

Historical uses 
Historically the benefits of olive leaves have been used in traditional medicine practices as folk remedies for the treatment of various illnesses. Studies suggest that olive leaf extract could help balance blood sugar in type 2 diabetes patients. However, scientific evidence for health effects of using olive leaf extract has been deemed insufficient by the European Food Safety Authority to prove any cause-and-effect relationship.

References

Olives
Medicinal plants
Leaves